Eois bermellada is a moth in the family Geometridae. It is found in Ecuador.

Adults have a brownish ground color and broad yellow margins on both forewings and hindwings.

References

Moths described in 1893
Eois
Moths of South America